Iresine chrysotricha, synonym Irenella chrysotricha, is a species of plant in the family Amaranthaceae. It is endemic to Ecuador.  Its natural habitats are subtropical or tropical dry forests and subtropical or tropical moist lowland forests. It is threatened by habitat loss.

References

chrysotricha
Endemic flora of Ecuador
Endangered plants
Taxonomy articles created by Polbot